Fatemeh Rakeei is an Iranian politician, linguist, poet and Alzahra University faculty.
Rakei was born in Zanjan, Zanjan Province. She was a member of the 6th Islamic Consultative Assembly from the electorate of Tehran. Now she is the secretary-general of population Muslim women modernity.

References

People from Zanjan, Iran
Living people
University of Tehran alumni
Tarbiat Modares University alumni
20th-century Iranian poets
Linguists from Iran
1954 births
Deputies of Tehran, Rey, Shemiranat and Eslamshahr
Members of the 6th Islamic Consultative Assembly
Islamic Iran Participation Front politicians
Union of Islamic Iran People Party politicians
Members of the Women's fraction of Islamic Consultative Assembly
Association of the Women of the Islamic Republic politicians
21st-century Iranian women politicians
21st-century Iranian politicians
Secretaries-General of political parties in Iran
21st-century Iranian poets